Perdita II (1881-1899) was a British Thoroughbred race mare who was an outstanding broodmare.

Racing record
She commenced her racing career as a selling plater, but proved a useful racemare by winning  seven races. Perdita II was purchased for the Prince of Wales in 1888 for £900.

Stud record
Perdita II was more influential as a broodmare, producing  the full brothers Florizel II (won Goodwood Cup, £7,858 and sired three Classic winners); Persimmon, Sandringham (unraced, exported to the US and sired some winners), and Diamond Jubilee.  Her sons earned over 75,000 guineas. In all, she produced 12 foals. Owing to the success of her descendants she was listed as a Cluster Mare, which is a Thoroughbred brood mare that has produced two or more winners of five or more of the eight most important and valuable races, within six generations.

Perdita II died in 1899.

See also
 List of leading Thoroughbred racehorses

References

External links
 Perdita 2nd
 Perdita II

1881 racehorse births
1899 racehorse deaths
Racehorses bred in the United Kingdom
Racehorses trained in the United Kingdom
Undefeated racehorses
Thoroughbred family 7-f